Nebpu served as the High Priest of Ptah at Memphis during the reign of King Amenemhat III in the late Twelfth Dynasty of Egypt. He was the son and successor in office of Sehetepebreankh-nedjem, who served King Senusret III.

In the Louvre Museum (A47), a quartzite group statue shows Sehetepebreankh-nedjem, Nebpu and a son (...hotepib-shery) which has been damaged, the statue being dedicated by Nebpu to his father and datable by style to the end of the Twelfth Dynasty. It was bought in 1816.

At Hazor, a fragmentary statue of Nebpu has been found.

References 

Officials of the Twelfth Dynasty of Egypt
Memphis High Priests of Ptah